JS Isoshio (SS-594) is the fifth boat of the s. She was commissioned on 14 March 2002.

Construction and career 
Isoshio was laid down at Kawasaki Heavy Industries Kobe Shipyard on 9 March 1998 and launched on 27 November 2000. She was commissioned on 14 March 2002 and deployed to Kure.

On 30 July 2003, she left Kure for RIMPAC 2003 in the United States and returned to Kure in late October.

Gallery

Citations

External links 

2000 ships
Oyashio-class submarines

Ships built by Kawasaki Heavy Industries